The province of A Coruña (historical ) is the northwesternmost province of Spain, and one of the four provinces which constitute the autonomous community of Galicia. This province is surrounded by the Atlantic Ocean to the west and north, Pontevedra Province to the south and Lugo Province to the east.

History 

The history of this province starts at the end of the Middle Ages during the reign of the Catholic Monarchs of Spain. During those years this province was far smaller than today.  This is because in the 1833 territorial division of Spain the entire Province of Betanzos together with half of the Mondoñedo were amalgamated into one single province with its capital city in A Coruña. 
Since 1833, the province has always been the one with the largest population and largest coast. Until the second half of the 20th century, this province was both the religious and cultural centre of the entire region. The University of Santiago de Compostela was the only university in North-western Spain until the arrival of democracy after the death of General Francisco Franco.

Population

Since 1877

Main sights 
The cathedral of Santiago de Compostela is the destination of the Way of St. James, a major historical pilgrimage route since the Middle Ages which still gathers thousands of pilgrims each year from all over the world.

Parks
 Atlantic Islands of Galicia National Park is the only national park in Galicia. It is shared between the Provinces of A Coruña and Pontevedra.
 The "Fragas" of the River Eume Natural Park extends itself throughout the Eume and Ferrol regions of Ferrolterra.
 The Dunes of Corrubedo Natural Park (Parque Natural das Dunas de Corrubedo e lagoas de Carregal e Vixán) is a beach park at the very end of the Barbanza Peninsula.

Transport

Airports and airfields
 Aeroporto da Lavacolla in Santiago de Compostela
 Aeroporto de Alvedro in the City of A Coruña
 Heliporto da Graña in the Naval Base of A Graña (Ferrolterra)
 Heliporto de Narón in Naron (Ferrolterra)

Railway
 Spanish National Railway Network Linking every major city: Ferrol, Betanzos, A Coruña and Santiago de Compostela
 Spanish Narrow-Gauge Railways Linking the City of Ferrol with different towns of Ferrol and Ortegal. This line is also known as Ferrol-Irun (Basque Country)
 Spanish High Speed Railway Network (AVE) Linking most major cities of the province with Lisbon and Madrid is under construction.

Economy

Ports
 A Coruña – Major Commercial Port – Rías Altas
 Malpica – Fishing Port – Costa da Morte
 Camariñas – Fishing Port – Costa da Morte
 Fisterra – Fishing Port – Costa da Morte
 Ferrol – Major Commercial Ports (also: Military) – Rias altas
 Cariño – Fishing Port – Rias altas
 Espasante – Fishing Port – Rias altas
 Cedeira – Fishing Port – Rias altas

Sport
 Deportivo de La Coruña Spanish Segunda Division team from the City of A Coruña.
 Racing Club de Ferrol Spanish Segunda Division team from the City of Ferrol.
 SD Compostela Spanish Tercera Division team from the City of Santiago de Compostela.
 Atlético Arteixo Spanish Segunda Division team from the Municipality of Arteixo.
 Bergantiños FC Spanish Tercera Division team from the Municipality of Carballo.
 SD Negreira Spanish Tercera Division team from the Municipality of Negreira.
 Autos Lobelle de Santiago FS Spanish División de Honor of Futsal team from the City of Santiago de Compostela.

See also
 List of municipalities in A Coruña

References